Stewardson may refer to:

People:
 Deon Stewardson (1951–2017), British-South African actor
 Joe Stewardson, South African film actor
 Thomas Stewardson (1781–1859), British portrait painter
 Trevor Stewardson (born 1977), Canadian boxer

Places:
 Stewardson, Illinois
 Stewardson Township, Potter County, Pennsylvania